Apple River may refer to:

Canada 
 Apple River, Nova Scotia, a community
 Apple River Airport, a grass landing strip

United States 
 Apple River (Illinois), a Mississippi tributary
 Apple River (Wisconsin), a St. Croix River tributary
 Apple River, Illinois, a village
 Apple River, Wisconsin, a town
 Apple River Fort, Elizabeth, Illinois

See also 
 Apple Creek (Mississippi River)
 Apple (disambiguation)
 Apple Creek (disambiguation)